Vertical Hold was an Australian musical group that had considerable success in their home state of South Australia, including #1 and #3 singles on the Adelaide charts, between 1980 and 1985, on the RCA and WEA labels. However, the group had little success elsewhere.

Renamed The Gladiators (minus Frost) in 1985, they featured on the RCA compilation LP "S.A. Brewing", with "Strange Love".

Lead singer Mick Michalopoulos died in 2016, aged 60.

Discography

Studio albums

Singles

References

Musical groups established in 1981
Musical groups disestablished in 1985